Marseilles is a town in Free State, South Africa. It is infrequently served by a station of the South African Railways.

The town is located 113 km east of Bloemfontein and 24 km west of Ladybrand. It was named after the port city of Marseille in France (historically spelt Marseilles in English).

See also 
 Railway stations in Lesotho

References 

Populated places in the Mantsopa Local Municipality